Jost Gippert  (born 12 March 1956 in Winz-Niederwenigern, later merged to Hattingen) is a German linguist, Caucasiologist, author, and professor for Comparative Linguistics at the Institute of Empirical Linguistics  at the Goethe University of Frankfurt.

Professional history 

In 1972, Gippert graduated from the Leibniz-Gymnasium in Essen, Germany. Having studied Comparative Linguistics, Indology, Japanese studies, and Chinese studies from 1972 to 1977 at the University of Marburg and the Free University of Berlin, he was awarded his Ph.D. in 1977 on the basis of his work on the syntax of infinitival formations in the Indo-European languages. From 1977 to 1990, he worked as a research fellow and held lectures at the universities of Berlin, Vienna and Salzburg. While being research assistant for Oriental Computational Linguistics in 1991, he habilitated at the University of Bamberg with his inaugural dissertation on the study of Iranian loanwords in Armenian and Georgian.

Since 1994, Gippert has been teaching Comparative Linguistics at the Goethe University of Frankfurt. He has been a member of the Gelati Science Academy (Georgia) since 1996, and of the department “Language” at the Berlin-Brandenburg Academy of Sciences and Humanities since 2007.

In 1997, he was appointed Honorary Professor of the Sulkhan Saba Orbeliani University in Tbilisi, Georgia, and, in 2009, he became Honorary Doctor at the Ivane Javakhishvili University also in Tbilisi, and was appointed Honorary Doctor at the Shota Rustaveli University in Batumi, Georgia, in 2013.

Since Gippert became Professor of Comparative Linguistics, much of his research has focused on the Indo-European languages, their history and etymology, as well as general linguistic typology and especially the study of languages of the Caucasus. Thanks to his dedication to the languages of the Caucasus, many international research projects have been undertaken in this area under his supervision. 
His research focuses on historical linguistics, linguistic typology, electronic text corpora, multimedia language documentation and electronic manuscript analysis.

Digital humanities

TITUS, ARMAZI, GNC and LOEWE 
Gippert is the founder and leader of the TITUS project (Thesaurus of Indo-European Texts and Languages). Its goal, since its foundation in 1987, has been the full digital accessibility of textually recorded material of various Indo-European and adjacent languages. In 1999, he started the ARMAZI project (Caucasian Languages and Cultures: Electronic Documentation), which aimed at a comprehensive collection of Caucasian languages material. This project yielded the Georgian National Corpus (GNC). 
Since 2010, Gippert has been the head of the center “Digital Humanities in the State of Hesse: Integrated Processing and Analysis of Text-based Corpora” within the unit of the “Federal Offensive for the Development of Scientific and Economic Excellence” (LOEWE (project)). This center is a collaboration between the Goethe University of Frankfurt and the Technische Universität Darmstadt with additional support from the Goethe Museum Frankfurt.

Electronic manuscript analysis 

In the 1990s, Gippert turned his attention to Oriental manuscripts, working on projects with the goal of making them digitally accessible, e.g., the Tocharian manuscripts of the Berlin Turfan Collection. Furthermore, he edited works including the Caucasian-Albanian palimpsest manuscripts found on Mount Sinai. In 2009, he was a visiting scholar in the research group “Manuscript Cultures” at the University of Hamburg. In summer 2013, he visited the University of Hamburg again, as a Petra Kappert Fellow, participating in the compilation of the “Encyclopedia of Manuscript Cultures” and of the handbook “Comparative Oriental Manuscript Studies”.

Activities

Selected projects 
 1995-1998 (DFG): Avesta and Rigveda: Electronic Analysis
 1995-1999 (INTAS): The Georgian Verbal System
 1999-2002 (Volkswagen Foundation, EUR 117,900): Caucasian Languages and Cultures: Electronic Documentation
 Since 2000 (DFG): Graduate School “Types of Clauses: Variation and Interpretation”
 2002-2006 (Volkswagen Foundation, EUR 167,800): Endangered Caucasian Languages in Georgia
 2003-2007 (Volkswagen Foundation): Palimpsest Manuscripts of Caucasian Provenience 
 2005-2009 (INTAS): Georgian Gospels 
 2005-2007 (Volkswagen Foundation, EUR 189,000): The Linguistic Situation in modern-day Georgia
 2008-2014 (DFG, EUR 240,000): Old German Reference Corpus
 Since 2008 (BMBF): German Language Resource Infrastructure
 2009 (Volkswagen Foundation, EUR 400,000): Aché Documentation Project
 Since 2009 (DFG/NEH, EUR 96,000): RELISH (Rendering Endangered Languages Lexicons Interoperable Through Standards Harmonization)
 Since 2009 (Volkswagen Foundation): Georgian Palimpsest Manuscripts
 2010 (Google Inc., US$49,600): Corpus Caucasicum
 Since 2011 (HMWK, EUR 3,792,000): LOEWE Research Unit “Digital Humanities – Integrated Processing and Analysis of Text-based Corpora”
 Since 2011 (Volkswagen Foundation, EUR 299,600): Khinalug Documentation Project
 Since 2011 (DFG): Relative Clauses in a Typological View
 Since 2012 (Volkswagen Foundation, EUR 390,400): Georgian National Corpus

Selected publications 

 1977: The syntax of infinitival formations in the Indo-European languages. (Europäische Hochschulschriften, 21/3), 360 pp.; Frankfurt, Bern, Las Vegas: Lang 1978. Dissertation
 1990: Iranica Armeno-Iberica. A study of Iranian loan words in Armenian and Georgian, 451 + 389 pp.; Vienna: Austrian Academy of Sciences 1993. Inaugural dissertation.
 2007: Gippert, Jost / Sarjveladze, Zurab / Kajaia, Lamara: The Old Georgian Palimpsest Codex Vindobonensis georgicus 2, edited by Jost Gippert in co-operation with Zurab Sarjveladze and Lamara Kajaia, 368 pp.; Turnhout: Brepols 2007.
 2008: Gippert, Jost / Schulze, Wolfgang / Aleksidze, Zaza / Mahé, Jean-Pierre: The Caucasian Albanian Palimpsests of Mount Sinai, 2 vols., XXIV + 530 pp.; Turnhout: Brepols 2009.
 2010: Gippert, Jost / Schulze, Wolfgang / Aleksidze, Zaza / Mahé, Jean-Pierre: The Caucasian Albanian Palimpsests of Mount Sinai. Vol. III: The Armenian Layer, edited by Jost Gippert., 220 pp.; Turnhout: Brepols 2010.

References

External links 

 Jost Gippert’s website

Academic staff of Goethe University Frankfurt
Linguists from Germany
1956 births
Living people
Kartvelian studies scholars